Jack Hughes (born May 14, 2001) is an American professional ice hockey center and alternate captain for the New Jersey Devils of the National Hockey League (NHL). A product of the U.S. National Development Team, Hughes was drafted first overall by the Devils in the 2019 NHL Entry Draft, a draft in which he was widely regarded as the top prospect.

Playing career

Minor and major junior career
While playing with the Mississauga Rebels of the Greater Toronto Hockey League (GTHL), Hughes applied for exceptional status to be able to enter the Canadian Hockey League a year early.  After his application was denied, he played his final year with the Toronto Marlboros, putting up 159 points.

After completing his minor career with the Marlboros, Hughes was drafted eighth overall by the Mississauga Steelheads in the Ontario Hockey League, despite his commitment to the U.S. National Team Development Program (USNTDP). Hughes kept his commitment and played with the USNTDP for the 2017–18 season. Splitting his time between the U17 and U18 team, he put up 116 points, nearly beating Auston Matthews's record. At the conclusion of the 2017–18 season, Hughes was awarded the Dave Tyler Junior Player of the Year Award as the best American-born player in junior hockey.

During the 2018–19 season, Hughes broke the NTDP all-time points record that was previously held by Clayton Keller. In a 12–4 win over the Green Bay Gamblers on March 15, 2019, he recorded five points to give him 190 overall. In the same game, teammate Cole Caufield broke the NTDP record for most goals.

New Jersey Devils
On June 21, 2019, at the 2019 NHL Entry Draft, Hughes was selected first overall by the New Jersey Devils. On July 12, Hughes signed a three-year entry level contract with the Devils. Hughes recorded his first career NHL point on October 17, in a game against the New York Rangers. In doing so, he became the third-youngest player in franchise history to record a point. Two days later, he recorded his first career NHL goal in a 1–0 win over the Vancouver Canucks.

On November 30, 2021, Hughes signed an eight-year, $64 million contract extension with the Devils. The following 2021–22 season was considered a breakout year for Hughes, despite missing seventeen games in October after dislocating his shoulder. He was selected to his first NHL All-Star Game in 2022, becoming the first player from the 2019 NHL draft class to be selected as an All-Star. After scoring a new career high of 26 goals and 30 assists in 49 games, the season ended on a disappointing note in early April when Hughes sustained an MCL sprain after a hit by New York Islanders right wing Oliver Wahlstrom, as a result of which he missed the final thirteen games.

International play

In the 2018 IIHF World U18 Championships Hughes was selected as the tournament MVP, named to the All-star team, and was chosen as the best forward of the tournament. He was also the best scorer of the tournament with 12 points in 7 games.

On December 23, 2018, Hughes was selected to compete at the 2019 World Junior Ice Hockey Championships alongside his brother Quinn. Hughes missed three games of the tournament with an undisclosed injury but returned to the lineup in time to help Team USA beat the Czech Republic. He recorded an assist on Noah Cates's goal in his return. Hughes ended the tournament with four assists as Team USA lost to Team Finland in the gold medal match. He later competed at the 2019 IIHF World U18 Championships where he broke Alexander Ovechkin's goals scored record as Team USA won a bronze medal.

On May 1, 2019, Hughes was named to the senior United States roster to compete at the 2019 IIHF World Championship alongside his brother. At the age of 17, Hughes became the youngest player to represent Team USA at an IIHF World Championship. On December 6, 2019, Hughes' NHL team, the New Jersey Devils, announced they would not release him to play for Team USA at the 2020 World Junior Ice Hockey Championships.

Personal life
Hughes was born in Orlando, Florida, but grew up in Toronto, Ontario. He cited his favorite player as Patrick Kane due to their similar smaller stature. Hughes played a variety of sports growing up, including hockey and baseball. Hughes is Jewish, had a bar mitzvah, and grew up celebrating Passover. His mother is Jewish and his father is Catholic, and he studied at Iona Catholic Secondary School.

Hughes comes from a family of ice hockey athletes. His older brother, Quinn, was drafted seventh overall in the 2018 NHL Entry Draft by the Vancouver Canucks. His younger brother Luke plays for the University of Michigan, and was drafted fourth overall by the Devils in the 2021 NHL Entry Draft. Their father, Jim Hughes, is a former hockey player and team captain for Providence College, an assistant coach for the Boston Bruins, and the director of player development for the Toronto Maple Leafs. His mother, Ellen Weinberg-Hughes, played ice hockey, lacrosse, and soccer at the University of New Hampshire and, in 2012, was inducted into the University of New Hampshire Athletics Hall of Fame. She also played for the United States women's national ice hockey team, and won a silver medal at the 1992 World Championship. His uncle Marty, and his cousin, Teddy Doherty, were also both involved in ice hockey. Marty last played in the British National League for the Dundee Stars, and Teddy last played for the Manchester Monarchs of the ECHL.

Career statistics

Regular season and playoffs

International

Awards and honors

See also
 List of first overall NHL draft picks
 List of New Jersey Devils draft picks
 List of select Jewish ice hockey players

References

External links
 

2001 births
Living people
21st-century American Jews
American men's ice hockey centers
American sportspeople of Canadian descent
Ice hockey people from Florida
Jewish American sportspeople
Jewish ice hockey players
National Hockey League first-overall draft picks
National Hockey League first-round draft picks
New Jersey Devils draft picks
New Jersey Devils players
Sportspeople from Orlando, Florida
USA Hockey National Team Development Program players